Ununiform is the thirteenth studio album by English trip hop artist Tricky. It was released by False Idols on 22 September 2017. Three singles were taken from this album, 'The Only Way', 'When We Die' and 'Running Wild', all of them released before the album. And alternative version of 'The Only Way' was uploaded on Tricky personal Soundcloud account a few weeks after the original, and later released as a single in 2018, this version was also included in the physical releases of the album, but unlisted in the back cover. The album features a variety of guest vocalists, including Russian rappers, American vocalists, his usual collaborator Francesca Belmonte, and Tricky's frequent-collaborator and former girlfriend Martina Topley-Bird. American hip hop artist Jay-Z co-engineered the album.

Recording
Tricky conceived the album while in Moscow, Russia; it consequently features vocal contributions from Russian rapper Smoky Mo. The album was recorded in Berlin, Germany. The album features a mixture of trip hop-inspired tracks as well as guitar-based tracks, including a cover version of "Doll Parts" by Hole, featuring vocals from Los Angeles-based artist Avalon Lurks.

Critical reception

Ununiform received generally positive reviews from critics. At Metacritic, which assigns a normalised rating out of 100 to reviews from mainstream publications, the album received an average score of 71, based on 12 reviews. Kitty Empire of The Observer gave the album 4 out of 5 stars, stating that "Tricky creates a claustrophobic world full of stark bass lines, pop digressions and slinky Bristol moments; his duet with Francesca Belmonte, New Stole, is particularly moreish."
Ben Cardew of Pitchfork gave the album 5.1 out of 10 stars, summarising: "ununiform may come nowhere near to the jaw-dropping impact of those early Tricky albums. But buried deep in his 13th studio release, Tricky may just have sown the seeds of a new musical contentment." The album was compared to Serge Gainsbourg's Histoire de Melody Nelson (1971) and The xx's Coexist (2012).

Track listing

Note
1  "Doll" is a cover of "Doll Parts" by Hole.
2  "Running Wild" was also co-written by Mina Rose.
3  "New Stole" is a reworked version of Francesca Belmonte song Stole from her debut album Anima.

Personnel

Musicians
Tricky – vocals, production
Scriptonite – vocals (tracks 2, 5, 6, 11)
Avalon Lurks – vocals, guitar (track 10)
Francesca Belmonte – vocals (track 3)
Asia Argento – vocals (track 4)
Mina Rose – vocals, guitar (tracks 7, 12)
Smoky Mo – vocals (track 11)
Martina Topley-Bird – vocals (track 13)
Terra Lopez – vocals (track 9)

Wim Janssens – guitar, synthesizer
Leon Schurz – bass
Muyi Liu – keyboards, piano
Tom Schneider – synthesizer
Technical
Jay-Z – engineering
BeatsBySmo – engineering, production
Levan Avazashvilli – engineering, production
Vasiliy Mikhaylovich Vakulenko – production

Charts

Notes

References

External links
ununiform at AllMusic

2017 albums
Experimental music albums by English artists
Tricky (musician) albums